Richard Benedict Goldschmidt (April 12, 1878 – April 24, 1958) was a German geneticist. He is considered the first to attempt to integrate genetics, development, and evolution.  He pioneered understanding of reaction norms, genetic assimilation, dynamical genetics, sex determination, and heterochrony. Controversially, Goldschmidt advanced a model of macroevolution through macromutations popularly known as the "Hopeful Monster" hypothesis.

Goldschmidt also described the nervous system of the nematode, a piece of work that influenced Sydney Brenner to study the "wiring diagram" of Caenorhabditis elegans, winning Brenner and his colleagues the Nobel Prize in 2002.

Childhood and education
Goldschmidt was born in Frankfurt-am-Main, Germany to upper-middle class parents of Ashkenazi Jewish heritage.  He had a classical education and entered the University of Heidelberg in 1896, where he became interested in natural history.  From 1899 Goldschmidt studied anatomy and zoology at the University of Heidelberg with Otto Bütschli and Carl Gegenbaur. He received his Ph.D. under Bütschli in 1902, studying development of the trematode Polystomum.

Career
In 1903 Goldschmidt began working as an assistant to Richard Hertwig at the University of Munich, where he continued his work on nematodes and their histology, including studies of the nervous system development of Ascaris and the anatomy of Amphioxus.  He founded the histology journal Archiv für Zellforschung  while working in Hertwig's laboratory.  Under Hertwig's influence, he also began to take an interest in chromosome behavior and the new field of genetics.

In 1909 Goldschmidt became professor at the University of Munich and, inspired by Wilhelm Johannsen's genetics treatise Elemente der exakten Erblichkeitslehre, began to study sex determination and other aspects of the genetics of Lymantria dispar, the gypsy moth, of which he was crossbreeding different races. He observed various stages of their sexual development, and found that some of the animals were neither male, nor female, nor hermaphrodites, but represented a whole spectrum of gynandromorphism. He named them 'intersex', and the phenomenon accordingly 'intersexuality' (Intersexualität). His studies of the gypsy moth, which culminated in his 1934 monograph Lymantria, became the basis for his theory of sex determination, which he worked on from 1911 until 1931.  Goldschmidt left Munich in 1914 for the position as head of the genetics section of the newly founded Kaiser Wilhelm Institute for Biology in Berlin.

During a field trip to Japan in 1914, he was unable to return to Germany due to the outbreak of the First World War, and was detained as an enemy alien in the United States. He was placed in an internment camp in Fort Oglethorpe, Georgia for "dangerous Germans". After his release in 1918, he returned to Germany in 1919 and resumed his work at the Kaiser Wilhelm Institute. Sensing that it was unsafe for him to remain in Germany, he emigrated in 1936 to the United States, where he became a professor at the University of California, Berkeley. During World War II, the Nazi party published a propaganda poster entitled "Jewish World Domination" displaying the Goldschmidt family tree.

Evolution

Goldschmidt was the first scientist to use the term "hopeful monster". He thought that small gradual changes could not bridge the divide between microevolution and macroevolution. In his book The Material Basis of Evolution (1940), he wrote  Goldschmidt believed the large changes in evolution were caused by macromutations (large mutations). His ideas about macromutations became known as the "hopeful monster" hypothesis, a type of saltational evolution, and attracted widespread ridicule.

According to Goldschmidt, "biologists seem inclined to think that because they have not themselves seen a 'large' mutation, such a thing cannot be possible. But such a mutation need only be an event of the most extraordinary rarity to provide the world with the important material for evolution". Goldschmidt believed that the neo-Darwinian view of gradual accumulation of small mutations was important but could account for variation only within species (microevolution) and was not a powerful enough source of evolutionary novelty to explain new species. Instead he believed that large genetic differences between species required profound "macro-mutations", a source for large genetic changes (macroevolution) which once in a while could occur as a "hopeful monster".

Goldschmidt is usually referred to as a "non-Darwinian"; however, he did not object to the general microevolutionary principles of the Darwinians. He veered from the synthetic theory only in his belief that a new species develops suddenly through discontinuous variation, or macromutation. Goldschmidt presented his hypothesis when neo-Darwinism was becoming dominant in the 1940s and 1950s, and strongly protested against the strict gradualism of neo-Darwinian theorists. His ideas were accordingly seen as highly unorthodox by most scientists and were subjected to ridicule and scorn. However, there has been a recent interest in the ideas of Goldschmidt in the field of evolutionary developmental biology, as some scientists, such as Günter Theißen and Scott F. Gilbert, are convinced he was not entirely wrong. Goldschmidt presented two mechanisms by which hopeful monsters might work. One mechanism, involving "systemic mutations", rejected the classical gene concept and is no longer considered by modern science; however, his second mechanism involved "developmental macromutations" in "rate genes" or "controlling genes" that change early development and thus cause large effects in the adult phenotype. These kinds of mutations are similar to those considered in contemporary evolutionary developmental biology.

Selected bibliography
 
 Goldschmidt, R. B. (1923). The Mechanism and Physiology of Sex Determination, Methuen & Co., London. (Translated by William Dakin)
 
 Goldschmidt, R. B. (1931). Die sexuellen Zwischenstufen, Springer, Berlin.
 
 Goldschmidt, R. B. (1940). The Material Basis of Evolution, New Haven CT: Yale Univ.Press. 
 
 Goldschmidt, R. B. (1960) In and Out of the Ivory Tower, Univ. of Washington Press, Seattle.

References

External links
 Stephen Jay Gould on Richard Goldschmidt
 Richard Goldschmidt
 Richard Benedict Goldschmidt: by Edward Goldsmith
 Guide to the Richard Goldschmidt Papers at The Bancroft Library
National Academy of Sciences Biographical Memoir

1878 births
1958 deaths
20th-century German biologists
American geneticists
German emigrants to the United States
German geneticists
Internments in the United States
Intersex and medicine
Jewish American scientists
Max Planck Institute directors
Mutationism
Scientists from Frankfurt